Richard Shannon may refer to:

 Richard Shannon (actor) (1920–1989), American actor
 Richard Shannon (American writer) (born 1954), American writer and performer
 Richard Shannon (historian), British historian and professor at Swansea
 Richard Shannon (priest), 20th century Archdeacon of Clonfert and Kilmacduagh
 Richard C. Shannon (1839–1920), American politician